Elena Vladislavovna Nikolaeva (born September 13, 1955, in Krasnoyarsk) is a Russian film director.

Biography
Nikolaeva is of Polish descent. She studied at the Faculty of History of Moscow State University, but after a while I took the documents. She worked on Abakan television.

In 1981 she graduated from the Directing Department of VGIK (workshop of Efim Dzigan).

In the 1990s, the 20th and first half of the 21st century worked in documentary films and advertising.

Personal life
Nikolaeva's husband, Alexey Rudakov is a film director, and screenwriter. Her son, Ivan Rudakov, was an actor and a rock singer who acted in some of her films, such as Popsa and Vanechka. Ivan Rudakov died from COVID-19 complications at the age of 43, on January 16, 2022.

References

Bibliography
 Natalia Miloserdova. Cinema of Russia: New Names (1986-1995). —  M .: Research Institute of Motion Picture Arts, 1996.

External links
 

1955 births
People from Krasnoyarsk
Soviet film directors
Soviet women film directors
Russian film directors
Russian women film directors
Living people
Russian people of Polish descent
Gerasimov Institute of Cinematography alumni